Jaime González (11 August 1933 – 28 November 2011) was a Spanish sports shooter. He competed for Spain at four Olympic Games between 1968 and 1980.

References

1933 births
2011 deaths
Spanish male sport shooters
Olympic shooters of Spain
Shooters at the 1968 Summer Olympics
Shooters at the 1972 Summer Olympics
Shooters at the 1976 Summer Olympics
Shooters at the 1980 Summer Olympics
Sportspeople from A Coruña
20th-century Spanish people